Carlos Alberto Rogger Dias (born 1 April 1990 in Rio de Janeiro), or simply Carlinhos, is a Brazilian footballer who plays as an attacking midfielder, left winger or left back for Alagoinhas.

References

External links

1990 births
Living people
Footballers from Rio de Janeiro (city)
Brazilian footballers
Brazilian expatriate footballers
Campeonato Brasileiro Série A players
Campeonato Brasileiro Série B players
Campeonato Brasileiro Série C players
Bolivian Primera División players
Madureira Esporte Clube players
CR Vasco da Gama players
Figueirense FC players
Paysandu Sport Club players
Associação Desportiva Cabofriense players
Mogi Mirim Esporte Clube players
União Recreativa dos Trabalhadores players
Macaé Esporte Futebol Clube players
C.D. Jorge Wilstermann players
Ypiranga Futebol Clube players
Clube Recreativo e Atlético Catalano players
Alagoinhas Atlético Clube players
Association football midfielders
Expatriate footballers in Bolivia
Brazilian expatriate sportspeople in Bolivia